This is the discography of the Irish alternative rock singer-songwriter, Gemma Hayes.

Since first becoming musically active in 2001, Hayes has released four studio albums.

Albums

Studio albums

Extended plays

Singles

B-sides
 Stop the Wheel – Hanging Around
 Parked – Hanging Around
 Hanging Around (acoustic) – Let a Good Thing Go
 Pieces of Glass (radio session) – Let a Good Thing Go
 Summers in Doubt – Let a Good Thing Go
 Ran for Miles (home demo) – Let a Good Thing Go
 Mama What's That Song – Back of My Hand
 Song for Julie – Back of My Hand
 My Friend Christian – Back of My Hand
 Let a Good Thing Go (from Radio 1's live lounge) – Back of My Hand
 Holy Place – Happy Sad
 Bad Day – Happy Sad
 Bless the Boy – Undercover
 Perfect Day – Undercover
 Something in my Way (video – live at Abbey Road) – Undercover
 Chasing (Remix)
 Palomino (Instrumental)

Side projects
'Lay Lady Lay' – Magnet featuring Gemma Hayes
'All The Way Down' – performed song written by Glen Hansard – The Cake Sale
'It's a Shame' – Anti Atlas featuring Gemma Hayes
'Reconsider Me' – performed by Gemma Hayes and Mundy (2010/2011) it later appeared on Mundy's 2011 release 'Shuffle'.
'Most of the Time' – Bob Dylan cover by both Gemma Hayes and Roddy Hart features on 'Dylan' EP released June 2011.
'Oh, Sister' – Bob Dylan cover by both Gemma Hayes and Roddy Hart features on 'Dylan' EP released June 2011.
'Jet', 'Devastated', 'Simple Life' and 'All The Kids Go – appeared on a collection of releases by Velvet Ear (2012).
'A Way To Say Goodbye' – Tim Christensen features Gemma Hayes on Volume 1: Acoustic Covers. 
'Tanaage Peak' (2013) – Halves featuring Gemma Hayes 
'Snowman' (2014)- Printer Clips'' featuring Gemma Hayes
 Gemma Hayes will feature on Reza Dinally's debut album Depths Of Montmartre.
 Counting Down the Days – Above & Beyond (band) featuring Gemma Hayes

Videography
 Hanging Around – Night on my Side
 Let a Good Thing Go – Night on my Side
 Back of my Hand – Night on my Side
 Happy Sad – The Roads Don't Love You
 Home – Hollow of Morning
 Oliver- Oliver EP
 Keep Running – Let It Break
 Palomino – Bones+Longing

References

Discographies of Irish artists
Rock music discographies